Rebordosa Atlético Clube (abbreviated as Rebordosa AC) is a Portuguese football club based in Rebordosa, Paredes in the district of Porto.

Background
Rebordosa AC currently plays in the Campeonato de Portugal which is the fourth tier of Portuguese football. The club was founded in 1966 and they play their home matches at the Monte de Azevido in Rebordosa, Paredes. The stadium is able to accommodate 12,000 spectators.

The club is affiliated to Associação de Futebol do Porto and has competed in the AF Porto Taça. The club has also entered the national cup competition known as Taça de Portugal on numerous occasions.

Season to season

Footnotes

Football clubs in Portugal
Association football clubs established in 1966
1966 establishments in Portugal